The Benson Building, also known as the Union Bus Depot, was an historic building located in downtown Ottumwa, Iowa, United States. The Tudor Revival style commercial building was completed in 1930. The one-story structure was composed of highly textured, painted brick. The façade featured a steeply-pitched gable roof and half-timbering. The building was originally used as an indoor miniature golf course. Its significance was attributed to its architecture.  It was individually listed on the National Register of Historic Places in 1995 as a part of the Ottumwa MPS. In 2016 it was included as a contributing property in the Greater Second Street Historic District.

On January 6, 2018, the structure caught fire and was destroyed. It was delisted from the National Register of Historic Places in 2019.

References

Commercial buildings completed in 1930
Tudor Revival architecture in Iowa
Buildings and structures in Ottumwa, Iowa
Former National Register of Historic Places in Iowa
Commercial buildings on the National Register of Historic Places in Iowa
National Register of Historic Places in Wapello County, Iowa
Individually listed contributing properties to historic districts on the National Register in Iowa